Rocky Mountain College (Rocky or RMC) is a private college in Billings, Montana.  It offers 50 liberal arts and professional majors in 24 undergraduate disciplines. In fall 2013, the college had 1069 enrolled students. It is affiliated with the United Methodist Church, the Presbyterian Church (USA), and the United Church of Christ.

History
Rocky Mountain College traces its history to the 1878 founding of the Montana Collegiate Institute in Deer Lodge, Montana.  Renamed the College of Montana, that institution closed in 1916, and in 1923 its assets were incorporated into Intermountain Union College (IUC), located in Helena.  A former president of the College of Montana, Lewis Eaton, founded the Billings Polytechnic Institute (BPI) in 1908 as the first postsecondary institution in Billings. RMC remains on Poly Drive, which leads to campus from downtown Billings. Intermountain Union relocated to the Billings Polytechnic campus after its Helena buildings were destroyed by a series of earthquakes in October and November, 1935. IUC merged with BPI in 1947, when students named their own school to create today's Rocky Mountain College.

Since the merger of Intermountain Union College and Billings Polytechnic Institute in 1947, Rocky Mountain College has had the following presidents as leaders:

 William D. Copeland, 1947–1951
 Herbert W Hines, 1951–1958
 Philip M. Widenhouse, 1958–1966
 Lawrence F. Small, 1966–1975
 Bruce T. Alton, 1975–1986
 James J. Rittenkamp Jr., 1986–1987
 Arthur H. DeRosier Jr., 1987–2002
 Thomas R. Oates, 2002–2005
 Michael R. Mace, 2005–2012
 Robert Wilmouth, 2012–present

Academics
Rocky Mountain College is accredited through the Northwest Commission on Colleges and Universities and the Office of Public Instruction for the State of Montana for the preparation of elementary and secondary teachers. The Accreditation Review Commission on Education accredits the physician assistant program for the Physician Assistant ARC-PA, while the Aeronautical Science major and Aviation Management major at Rocky Mountain College are both accredited by the Aviation Accreditation Board International (AABI).

Athletics
The Rocky Mountain athletic teams are the Battlin' Bears. The college is a member of the National Association of Intercollegiate Athletics (NAIA), primarily competing in the Frontier Conference for most of its sports since the 1936–37 academic year; while its skiing teams compete in the United States Collegiate Ski and Snowboard Association (USCSA).

Rocky Mountain competes in 17 intercollegiate varsity sports: Men's sports include basketball, cross country, football, golf, soccer and track & field (indoor and outdoor); while women's sports include basketball, cross country, golf, soccer, track & field (indoor and outdoor) and volleyball; and co-ed sports include cheerleading, ski racing and stunt.

Basketball
In 2014, the Battlin' Bears men's basketball team won the Frontier Conference championship and three teammates were named to the NAIA All-America team. In 2009, the Battlin' Bears men's basketball team won the NAIA Division I National Championship, the school's first NAIA title.

Skiing
The Battlin' Bears women's ski team, which competes in the United States Collegiate Ski and Snowboard Association (USCSA), won a national championship in 2014. The men's ski team won RMC's first national sports championship in 2005, continuing to take national championships again in 2007, 2011, 2016, 2017, 2018, and most recently, 2020.

Notable alumni and faculty

 Valeen Tippetts Avery, biographer and historian
 Bob Bees, American football player
 Bill Bowers, mime and actor
 Lane Chandler, actor
 Jason Earles, actor
 Al Feldstein, painter (honorary Doctorate of Arts in 1999)
 Arlo Guthrie, folksinger (did not graduate)
 Larry R. Heather, frequent Christian Heritage Party of Canada candidate
 Chris Horn, former Carolina Panthers wide receiver
 J. Timothy Hunt, journalist and author
 Jill McLain, Miss Montana USA 2005
 Kasey Peters, American football player
 Todd Reed, author, consultant and professional speaker

 Mark Soueidi, Professor of Low Brass & Music Director, Conn-Selmer Performing Artist

 Sidney Runyan Thomas, United States federal appellate judge, taught at RMC from 1982 to 1995
 Michal Wisniowski, artist

References

External links
 Official website
 Official athletics website

 
Universities and colleges affiliated with the Presbyterian Church (USA)
Universities and colleges affiliated with the United Church of Christ
Liberal arts colleges in Montana
Educational institutions established in 1878
Universities and colleges accredited by the Northwest Commission on Colleges and Universities
Buildings and structures in Billings, Montana
Frontier Conference
1878 establishments in Montana Territory
Tourist attractions in Billings, Montana
Private universities and colleges in Montana